The Tripods is a television adaptation of John Christopher's The Tripods series of novels. It was jointly produced by the BBC in the United Kingdom and the Seven Network in Australia. The music soundtrack was written by Ken Freeman.

Series one of The Tripods, broadcast in 1984, had 13 half-hour episodes written by Alick Rowe, the author of many radio plays, and covers the first book, The White Mountains; the 12-episode second series (1985) written by Christopher Penfold covers The City of Gold and Lead.  Although a television script had been written for the third series, it was cancelled by BBC executives Michael Grade and Jonathan Powell due to the adaptation failing in the ratings.

The first series was released on both VHS and DVD. The BBC released Tripods — The Complete Series 1 & 2 on DVD in March 2009.

Production

The series introduced several minor changes from the book, notably the shape of the Masters and Tripods, which have tentacles (although the Tripods do have a mechanical claw-arm that they sometimes use) in the book; the Black Guard was introduced to serve as a tangible human antagonist as overuse of the Tripods themselves would be expensive to film and undermine their dramatic presence; gravity inside the Golden City was increased artificially, which is not mentioned in the TV series; the introduction of "cognoscs", spiritual life-forms vastly superior to the Masters themselves; and more other main characters, including love interests for both Will and Beanpole. The original texts have few female characters. John Christopher was asked about this for an interview on Wordcandy, replying that at the time of writing the series, it was generally accepted that girls would read books with boy main characters, but not vice versa. He also stated that he felt the addition of an entire family of girls to the TV series was somewhat "over the top". The series is also notable for featuring non-humanoid aliens, which was uncommon at the time.

Charlotte Long, who played Will's love interest Eloise, died in a car crash shortly after the start of transmission of the first series. For the second series, the role was briefly recast, with Cindy Shelley appearing as Eloise during a dream sequence.

The models of the Tripods used throughout the two series were built by Martin Bower from designs by Steve Drewett.

Filming locations
The following is a list of fictional locations in the show, the series, the episode in which the location appeared, and the actual location (all in the UK except where shown):

Reception
In the book The Classic British Telefantasy Guide, Paul Cornell, Martin Day and Keith Topping wrote "The Tripods could have been one of the most impressive of all BBC Telefantasy productions but sadly, due to a mixture of lacklustre scripts, the inexperience of several of the young cast, some cheap special effects and a plodding snail's pace, it fell flat on its face. On a brighter note, the performances of John Shackley, Roderick Horn, John Woodvine and Pamela Salem were, at least, watchable."

Video game
BBC Enterprises licensed a video game adaptation of the TV series in 1985. It was designed by Watermill Productions for the ZX Spectrum and published by Red Shift.

Film adaptation
Disney has owned the film rights to The Tripods since 1997. It was reported in 2005 that a cinematic version was in pre-production with Australian-born director Gregor Jordan signed on to rewrite and direct for Walt Disney's Touchstone Pictures label.

DVD & soundtrack
A DVD release of the complete series 1 & 2 was released on 23 March 2009 (Region 2). A new soundtrack album, The Tripods: Pool of Fire Suite by original composer Ken Freeman inspired by the unmade third series of Tripods was released at the same time.

References

External links

 

BBC science fiction television shows
Television shows based on British novels
1980s British science fiction television series
1984 British television series debuts
1985 British television series endings
Post-apocalyptic television series
Unfinished creative works
Television shows shot at BBC Elstree Centre